Polyalthiopsis is an Asian tree genus in the family Annonaceae and tribe Miliuseae.  Its native range is southern Vietnam.

Species
At the time of writing (2022), Plants of the World Online and the NCBI include the following species:
 Polyalthiopsis chinensis (S.K.Wu & P.T.Li) B.Xue & Y.H.Tan;
 Polyalthiopsis floribunda (Jovet-Ast) Chaowasku, which was originally described in the genus Polyalthia (and also has been placed in Huberantha) is the type species (locality Vietnam);
 Polyalthiopsis verrucipes  (C.Y.Wu ex P.T.Li) B.Xue & Y.H.Tan.

References

External links 
 

Annonaceae
Flora of Indo-China
Annonaceae genera